The 2021-2022 Israeli Basketball National League will be the 22nd season as second tier since its re-alignment in 2000 and the 68th season of second-tier basketball in Israel.

Teams
The following teams have changed division since the 2020–2021 season.

To Liga Leumit
Promoted from Liga Artzit
 Maccabi Ma'ale Adumim (South Division)
 Hapoel Migdal HaEmek/Jezreel (North Division)

Relegated from Premier League
 Ironi Nahariya
 Maccabi Haifa

From Liga Leumit
Promoted to Premier League
 
 Hapoel Galil Elyon

Relegated to Liga Artzit
 Maccabi Kiryat Motzkin
 Elitzur Yavne
 Hapoel Acre/Mateh Asher

Venues and locations

Regular season

League table

Rounds 1 to 30

Playouts

Playoffs

Quarterfinals

|}

Game 1

Game 2

Game 3

if necessary

Game 4

Semifinals

|}

Game 1

Game 2

Game 3

Game 4

Finals

|}

if necessary

Awards

MVP of the Round

References

Israeli
Basketball